Downes, is a surname of Irish and English origin, and may refer to:

 Aaron Downes (born 1985), Australian footballer
 Aidan Downes (born 1988), Irish footballer
 Alexander Downes (18681950), Australian-born rugby player and cricketer who relocated to New Zealand
 Andrew Downes (scholar) (1628), English classical scholar
 Andrew Downes (composer) (born 1950), British classical composer
 Arthur Downes (18831956), Scottish sailor who competed at the 1908 Summer Olympics
 Arthur Downes (police officer) (18951984), British-born New Zealand soldier, clerk, salesman and policeman
 Austin Downes (active 193031), American football player at the University of Georgia
 Bessie Downes (1860-1920) Elizabeth (Bessie) Downes, botanical artist, Southport, UK
 Bob Downes (born 1937), English avant-garde jazz flautist and saxophonist
 Bobby Downes (footballer) (born 1949), English footballer
 Bobby Downes (born before 1983), American movie producer, elder brother of Kevin Downes
 Disappearance of Charlene Downes (19892003), English suspected murder victim
 Danny Downes (born 1986), American mixed martial artist
 David Downes (disambiguation), multiple people
 Doris Downes (born 1961), American botanical artist, painter of natural history, and writer
 Edward Downes (19112001), American musicologist, critic and quizmaster for the Metropolitan Opera
 Sir Edward Downes (19242009), British conductor
 Flynn Downes (born 1999), English footballer
 Francis Downes (160648), English politician
 Fred Downes (18551917), Australian politician
 Garry Downes (born 1944), Australian judge
 Geoff Downes (born 1952), English rock songwriter, record producer, and musician
 Henry Downes (disambiguation), multiple people (including Harry)
 John Downes (disambiguation), multiple people
 Johnny Haddon Downes (19202004), English Royal Air Force flyer and television producer
 Joseph M. Downes (before 19461993), American politician in Massachusetts
 Julia Downes (born before 1982), songwriter, musician and producer
 Katie Downes (born 1984), English glamour model
 Kerry Downes (1930–2019), English architectural historian, son of Ralph Downes
 Kevin Downes (born 1972), American actor, writer, producer and director, younger brother of Bobby Barnes
 Kevin Downes (hurler) (born 1991), Irish hurler
 Kit Downes (born before 2007), British jazz pianist
 Kyle Downes (born 1983), Canadian-American actor
 Larry Downes (born before 1998), American internet industry analyst and author on business strategies and information technology
 Lawrence Downes (born before 1986), American journalist
 Lorraine Downes (born 1964), New Zealand dancer and beauty queen
 Major Downes (18341923), British army officer
 Mark Downes (born 1974), English cricketer
 Melissa Downes (born 1971), Australian broadcast journalist
 Mike Downes (born 1979), American telecom entrepreneur and iconic world traveler
 Miranda Downes (died 1985), Australian screenwriter
 Olin Downes (18861955), American classical music critic
 P. G. Downes (AKA Spike Downes, 190959), American school teacher, author and explorer
 Paul Downes (born before 1968), English folk guitarist, singer and composer
 Percy Downes (190589), English footballer
 Rackstraw Downes (born 1939), British-born realist painter and author
 Ralph Downes (190493), English organist, father of Kerry Downes
 Rebecca Downes, English blues rock singer, guitarist, songwriter and vocal coach
 Richard Downes (journalist) (active from 1985), Irish broadcaster and journalist
 Robin Atkin Downes (born 1978), English screen and voice actor
 Roger Downes (before 16011638), English lawyer and politician
 Rupert Downes (18851945), Australian soldier, general, surgeon and historian
 Stephen Downes (disambiguation), multiple people (including Steve and Steven)
 Terry Downes (1936–2017), British professional boxer
 Thomas William Downes (18681938), New Zealand historian, ethnologist and river works supervisor
 Tony Downes (active 2012), British academic lawyer
 Tyrone Downes (born 1957), Barbadian professional boxer
 Wally Downes (born 1961), English football player, manager and coach
 Willard A. Downes (19082000), American artist and illustrator
 William Downes (disambiguation), multiple people

See also
 Baron Downes, a former title in the peerage of Ireland
 Downes v. Bidwell, a U.S. Supreme Court case of 1901
 Mollie Panter-Downes (190697), American novelist and newspaper columnist
 Molly Smitten-Downes (born 1987), British singer-songwriter
 Richard Downes Jackson (17771845), English-born Canadian administrator
 William Downes Griffith (18291908), Attorney General of Cape Colony 186672
 Downs (surname)
 Down (surname)

 

English-language surnames